Migalovo (also given as Tver Migalovo, Kalinin)  is an air base in Tver Oblast, Russia located 10 km west of Tver. It is a large military airlift base.  It currently houses all of Russia's remaining Antonov An-22 fleet. It is an Ilyushin Il-76 base, with some Antonov An-12 aircraft stored.

The base is home to the 2nd Central Scientific Research Institute and  the 8th Military Transport Aviation Regiment which is part of the 12th Mginska Krasnoznamennaya Military Transport Aircraft Division.

Some of the units that made Migalovo home were:
 Headquarters 12th Military Transport Aviation Division (from 1946, under the title 12th Transport Aviation Division)
 8 VTAP (8th Military Transport Aviation Regiment) flying An-12 and An-22.
 196 VTAP (196th Military Transport Aviation Regiment) flying Il-76.
 224 LO VTA (224th Transport Aviation ~Detachment~) flying Il-76 and An-124.
 2 TSNII (2nd Central Scientific Research and Test Institute of the Ministry of Defense).
 274th Fighter-Bomber Aviation Regiment (274 APIB) flying Su-17C. Arrived from Kubinka in December 1974. Disbanded 1993. Under 9th Fighter Aviation Division.

References

Soviet Air Force bases
Soviet Military Transport Aviation
Russian Air Force bases